Rainbow Warrior (sometimes Rainbow Warrior III) is a purpose-built motor-assisted sailing yacht owned and operated by Greenpeace and intended for use in their activities such as environmental protests and scientific excursions. She was christened on October 14, 2011, and has replaced Rainbow Warrior II after further upgrades and maintenance of the older ship had been shown to be impractical.

The vessel is the first Rainbow Warrior that is not converted from another vessel. Her hull was constructed in Poland and she was fitted out in Germany. She has state-of-the-art facilities including advanced telecommunication equipment, specialised scientific equipment, and a helicopter landing pad. The ship is also designed to be one of the "greenest" ships afloat, and to showcase this quality, it runs primarily using wind power, with a 55 m mast system which carries 1255 sq meters of sail. The ship also has Volvo Penta D65A MT 1850 HP diesel-electric engine and carries up to 110'000 litres diesel fuel. On board the ship can store up to 59 cubic meters of greywater and blackwater, avoiding the need for disposal at sea. All materials, from the paintwork to the insulation, have been chosen with a view to sustainability, and each component has been supplied with transparent ethical sourcing.

Construction and crowdfunding

Construction of the ship began in the summer of 2010 in Gdansk before being transported to the Fassmer Shipyard near Bremen in Germany to be fitted out before being launched in October 2011. The ship was in part funded by a crowd funding project set up by Greenpeace. Supporters were encouraged to buy parts of the ship through a specifically designed website. Supporters in turn received a certificate for their contribution and had their names etched onto a digital artwork on board the vessel. The website live-streamed names and messages, tying people directly to the part of the ship they contributed to. The multimedia site was also accompanied by a webcam allowing people to follow the ship's construction up to its launch date. The project received over 100,000 donors from around the world.

First tour

After its launch in Bremerhaven, Germany, the new Rainbow Warrior toured ports in Europe (Hamburg, Amsterdam, London, Stockholm and Barcelona) welcoming supporters on board the new ship and holding specific events such as onboard concerts. The ship was also visited by celebrity supporters such as Radiohead's Thom Yorke, who was part of the ship's maiden voyage, and Michelin two-starred chef Diego Guerrero in Barcelona. In January 2012, the ship travelled to the East Coast of the US, planning to dock at New York City, Baltimore, Southport, North Carolina, Fort Lauderdale and St. Petersburg, Florida. In March 2013, the ship travelled to Australia.

See also
Rainbow Warrior (1955)
Rainbow Warrior (1957)
MV Arctic Sunrise
MV Esperanza
MV Sirius
Legend of the Rainbow Warriors

References

External links
 Rainbow Warrior website
Stories from the Rainbow Warrior YouTube
Greenpeace orders technologically advanced Rainbow Warrior III (Greenpeace press release, 2 July 2009)
We're gonna need a bigger boat! (Greenpeace press release with artist's impression, 2 July 2009)
 Virtual Tour of the Rainbow Warrior III in Cozumel (360TOURIST Mexico)

Ships built in Bremen (state)
Individual sailing yachts
Ships of Greenpeace
2011 ships
Sailing ships of the Netherlands
Merchant ships of the Netherlands